Lélouma (Pular: 𞤂𞤫𞥅𞤤𞤵𞤥𞤢𞥄) is a prefecture located in the Labé Region of Guinea. The capital is Lélouma. The prefecture covers an area of 2,140 km.² In census of 2014, it had  population of 163,000.

Sub-prefectures
The prefecture is divided administratively into 11 sub-prefectures:
 Lélouma-Centre
 Balaya
 Djountou
 Hérico
 Korbé
 Lafou
 Linsan
 Manda
 Parawol
 Sagalé
 Tyanguel-Bori

References 

Prefectures of Guinea
Labé Region